The 1894 Buchtel football team represented Buchtel College (now Akron University) in the 1894 college football season. The team was led by second-year head coach John Heisman. They outscored their lone opponent Ohio State, 12–6, and finished with a record of 1–0.

Schedule

References

Buchtel
Akron Zips football seasons
College football undefeated seasons
Buchtel football